Uniphore is a conversational automation technology company. Uniphore sells software for conversational analytics, conversational assistants and conversational security. The company is headquartered in Palo Alto, California, with offices in the United States, Singapore, India, Japan, Spain, and Israel. Its products help up to 75,000 customer service agents during approximately 160 million interactions per month.

Deloitte Technology Fast 50 India identified Uniphore as the 17th fastest-growing technology company in India in 2012 and one of the top 500 fastest growing companies in the Asia-Pacific region in 2014. In 2016, Time included Sachdev on its list of "10 millennials who are changing the world" for “building a phone that can understand almost any language”. NASSCOM named Uniphore to its "League of 10" emerging Indian technology companies in 2017. In 2020, the San Francisco Business Times ranked Uniphore as  among small companies in its list of the best places to work in the San Francisco Bay Area. In 2022, the company was featured on the Forbes AI 50 list.

History 
Uniphore Software Systems was founded by Umesh Sachdev and Ravi Saraogi in 2008 and was incubated at IIT Madras. The company received an initial grant of $100,000 from the National Research Development Corporation.

Initially, the company operated a call center providing voice-based internet services to people in rural areas. Uniphore then began working on speech recognition technology, partnering with companies that specialized in English and European languages, and adapting the technology for Indian languages and dialects. In 2014, Uniphore released its flagship product, auMina, along with two other products, Akeira and amVoice.

Uniphore raised series A funding, led by Kris Gopalakrishnan (cofounder of Infosys), in April 2015. The next month, Uniphore received additional investment from IDG Ventures. With input from its investors, Uniphore changed its business model from license fee-based income to a software as a service-based subscription fee model in 2015. By June 2016, it had added more than 70 global languages and expanded its services to Southeast Asia, the Middle East, and the United States. The company opened operations in Singapore in October 2016. The company raised Series B funding in October 2017, led by John Chambers and existing investors. Series C funding of $51 million was announced in August 2019 and led by March Capital.

Uniphore acquired an exclusive third-party license for robotic process automation technology from NTT DATA in October 2020. In January 2021, Uniphore acquired Emotion Research Lab, a startup based in Spain that uses artificial intelligence and machine learning to analyze video and interpret emotions. The company received $140 million in Series D funding, led by Sorenson Capital Partners, in March 2021, bringing total funding to $210 million. Uniphore acquired Jacada, a company that specializes in improving and automating contact center processes, in July 2021.

Products 
Uniphore's main platform offers four core services: U-Analyze, U-Self-Serve, for businesses setting up a conversational AI assistant; U-Trust, for automated voice authentication to verify the identity of an agent working remotely; and U-Assist, which provides transcriptions and alerts in real time during a call. The company says its goal is to supplement, not replace, the efforts of call center staff.

U-Analyze 
Uniphore's speech analytics software, U-Analyze (formerly auMina), helps organizations identify customer problems by analyzing customer dynamics and call center interactions using natural language processing. It uses artificial intelligence and data analysis to monitor agents' in-call movements and optimize training programs.

U-Self Serve 
U-Self Serve (formerly Akeira) is an interactive voice response software and virtual assistant that can help automate customer service for organizations.

U-Trust 
U-Trust (formerly amVoice) is a voice biometrics platform that allows the user to authenticate their identity using their voice when working remotely.

U-Assist 
U-Assist uses deep learning AI models to provide support, including transcriptions and alerts, in real time during calls. It also helps automate dispositions and other work after a call.

Q for Sales 
Q for Sales system uses technology including emotion AI, speech recognition, and natural language processing to interpret emotional cues. It can provide real-time data to a salesperson to evaluate a potential customer's engagement and sentiment during a video call.

Critics including AI ethics scholar Kate Crawford and AI researcher Timnit Gebru have questioned the premise of such systems.

References

Further reading
 The Business Standard
 The Economic Times
 The News Minute
 Times of India
 The Economic Times
 The Hindu
 The Economic times

Companies based in Palo Alto, California
Indian companies established in 2008
Speech recognition
Technology companies established in 2008
2008 establishments in Tamil Nadu